Below is a list of Missouri state high school football championships  sanctioned by the Missouri State High School Activities Association  since the organization began holding the tournaments in 1968.

There have been seven ties for state champion.  In 2002 when the organization changed its classification system it also changed the rules so that a champion would be determined in overtime.  The asterisks indicate the number of overtimes in 2004, 2006 and 2008.

Championships

See also
 List of Missouri state high school baseball champions
 List of Missouri state high school boys basketball championships
 List of Missouri state high school girls basketball championships
 List of Missouri state high school girls volleyball championships
 List of Missouri high schools by athletic conferences

References

High school football in Missouri
high school football